Country Code: +245
International Call Prefix: 00
Trunk Prefix: none

Calling formats
To call from within Guinea-Bissau, use the full nine-digit number.
For calls from outside Guinea-Bissau, prepend +245 to the nine-digit number.

List of area codes and mobile operators in Guinea-Bissau

References

 ITU allocations list

Guinea-Bissau
Telecommunications in Guinea-Bissau
Telephone numbers